Second St. Joseph Hotel is a historic hotel building located at South Bend, St. Joseph County, Indiana. It was built in 1868, and is a three-story, Federal style brick building. It is the oldest extant commercial building in the city of South Bend.  It was used as a hotel until 1876, after which it housed a variety of commercial enterprises.  It is located next to the John G. Kerr Company building.

It was listed on the National Register of Historic Places in 1985.

References

Hotel buildings on the National Register of Historic Places in Indiana
Federal architecture in Indiana
Hotel buildings completed in 1868
Buildings and structures in South Bend, Indiana
National Register of Historic Places in St. Joseph County, Indiana